Lieutenant General Sir John Dudley Lavarack,  (19 December 1885 – 4 December 1957) was an Australian Army officer who was Governor of Queensland from 1 October 1946 to 4 December 1957, the first Australian-born governor of that state.

Early life

Lavarack was born in Kangaroo Point, a suburb of Brisbane in Queensland, on 19 December 1885. He was educated at Brisbane Grammar School, where he excelled in the school's army cadets program.

Military career

First World War
On 7 August 1905, Lavarack was commissioned as a lieutenant in the Royal Australian Artillery. In early 1913, he trained as an officer at the Staff College, Camberley in England, and upon the outbreak of the First World War was assigned first to the War Office, then as a brigade major of the 22nd Division artillery. Lavarack's division spent a month in France during September 1915, but was transferred to Salonica in Greece, where it fought in the Balkans Campaign.

In February 1915, Lavarack was assigned to the Australian Imperial Force, but did not join it until July 1916 when he joined the Australian 2nd Division for the Battle of Pozières. He was subsequently assigned as brigade major for the 5th Division, commanding two field artillery batteries during fighting at the Somme and the advance on the Hindenburg Line. In May 1917, his staff college training saw him transferred to 1st Division headquarters, which instigated a lifelong mutual antagonism between Lavarack and his superior at HQ, Thomas Blamey.

By December 1917, Lavarack was a lieutenant colonel and general staff officer, 1st grade, in the Australian 4th Division, and took part in battles at Dernancourt, Villers-Bretonneux, Hamel and Amiens, with Lavarack's hand in planning for the Battle of Hamel setting the stage for several subsequent Australian victories.

Between the wars
After the war, Lavarack returned to Australia, where he took up a post at the Royal Military College, Duntroon. In 1926, he was promoted to brevet colonel, and in 1927 attended the Imperial Defence College in London. Back in Australia in 1929, he found himself in heavy debate with fellow IDC student Frederick Shedden over the Australian government's adoption of the "Singapore strategy". Shedden believed that the presence of the Royal Navy in Singapore would deter any aggression from Japan, whilst Lavarack was sure that Japan would take advantage of Britain's focus on Europe and that Australian army forces should prepare for a possible invasion.

In January 1933, Lavarack was made commandant of the Royal Military College, Duntroon. On 21 April 1935, with a temporary promotion to major general (later made permanent in June), he was appointed Chief of the General Staff (CGS), the head of the Australian Army. As CGS, Lavarack pulled no punches over what he saw as an over-reliance on the Royal Navy and neglect of Australia's land forces—renewing his argument with Shedden, and causing considerable friction with the Australian government, in particular a number of successive ministers for Defence.

Second World War
In 1938, British officer Lieutenant General Ernest Squires was appointed Inspector-General of the Australian Military Forces. Lavarack and Squires worked together to prepare Australia for war, and by the time Lavarack returned from a tour of Britain, the Second World War had begun. With Squires replacing him as CGS, Lavarack was promoted to lieutenant general and made General Officer Commanding Southern Command. In 1940, Lavarack was considered to command 6th Division, but Thomas Blamey, now the commander of I Corps, refused his appointment, citing "defects of character". Lavarack instead took command of the newly formed 7th Division, also accepting a demotion to major general which was almost certainly instigated by Blamey.

In 1941, the commander-in-chief in the Middle East, Lord Wavell, ordered Lavarack to Tobruk, where his units were successful in repelling Erwin Rommel's forces. Wavell requested Lavarack take command of the Western Desert Force, but he was once again confounded by Blamey, who insisted that he was unsuitable for high command. After further successes in the Syria-Lebanon Campaign, Lavarack was re-promoted to lieutenant general, and took over Blamey's role as commander of I Corps, with Blamey now deputy commander-in-chief in the Middle East.

Following the outbreak of war with Japan, I Corps was shifted to the Far East, arriving in Java in January 1942. Lavarack was recalled to Australia, where he was made acting commander-in-chief of Australian forces whilst waiting for Blamey to return from the Middle East to fill the role. He then commanded the Australian First Army, with responsibility for defending Queensland and New South Wales. In 1944, he flew to the United States where he became head of the Australian Military Mission, and was military advisor for Australia to the United Nations Conference on International Organization. He returned to Australia in August 1946, and frustrated by his lack of active command and constantly being passed over by Blamey and others, he retired from the military in September that year.

Governor of Queensland

In 1946, the Premier of Queensland, Ned Hanlon, offered the post of Governor of Queensland to Lieutenant General Sir Leslie Morshead, who declined. Hanlon then offered the post to Lavarack, who accepted and was sworn in on 1 October—the second Australian-born person to hold a governorship in Australia (Sir John Northcott had been made Governor of New South Wales two months previously). After completing his five-year term in 1951, Lavarack's governorship was extended by another five years to 1956. In February 1952, he proclaimed Queen Elizabeth II as the monarch in Queensland, following the death of her father King George VI. Lavarack's oath of allegiance and oath of office were then re-administered (at his request) to reflect the new monarch. He was then reappointed for a further year from 1 October 1956, but due to ill health, Lavarack only served four months of the extended term, and was relieved of his duties on 25 January 1957 by his lieutenant governor, although he officially remained governor until September 1957.

Later life

Lavarack retired to his home in Buderim on a pension of £1000 per annum. On 4 December 1957, he collapsed at the breakfast table and died. He was survived by his wife and three sons. A state funeral was held on 5 December 1957.

Honours
For his service during the First World War, Lavarack was awarded the Distinguished Service Order (1918) and the French Croix de guerre (1919). He was appointed a Companion of the Order of St Michael and St George in 1919, and Mentioned in Despatches three times.

In 1942, following I Corps' actions in the Syria-Lebanon Campaign, he was appointed a Knight Commander of the Order of the British Empire (KBE). He was appointed a Knight Commander of the Royal Victorian Order in 1954 and a Knight Commander of the Order of St Michael and St George in 1955 while Governor of Queensland.

The Lavarack Barracks in Townsville, Queensland were named in his honour.

References

|-

|-

|-

1885 births
1957 deaths
Military personnel from Brisbane
Graduates of the Royal College of Defence Studies
Australian Companions of the Distinguished Service Order
Australian Companions of the Order of the Bath
Australian generals
Australian Knights Commander of the Order of St Michael and St George
Australian Knights Commander of the Order of the British Empire
Australian Knights Commander of the Royal Victorian Order
Australian military personnel of World War I
Australian Army personnel of World War II
Graduates of the Staff College, Camberley
Governors of Queensland
People from Brisbane
Recipients of the Croix de Guerre 1914–1918 (France)